Battery M, 2nd Missouri Light Artillery Regiment was an artillery battery that served in the Union Army during the American Civil War and Plains Indian Wars.

Service
Organized at St. Louis, Mo., January, 1862. Attached to District of St. Louis, Mo., Dept. of Missouri, to November, 1862. 2nd Division, Army of Southeast Missouri, Dept. of Missouri, to March, 1863. District of Southeast Missouri, Dept. of Missouri, to June, 1863. Artillery, 1st Cavalry Division, District of Southeast Missouri, to July, 1863. Artillery Reserve, Cavalry Division, Army of Southeast Missouri, Dept. of Missouri, to August, 1863. Artillery 1st Cavalry Division, Arkansas Expedition, to September, 1863. Attached to District of St. Louis, Mo., to June, 1865.

Detailed service
Duty in District of St. Louis till November, 1862. Pitman's Ferry, Ark., October 27, 1862. At St. Louis till June, 1863. Joined Division at Pilot Knob, Mo., June, 1863. Davidson's march to join Steele and Steele's Expedition to Little Rock, Ark., July 1-September 10. March to Clarendon, on White River, July 1-August 8. Shallow Ford Bayou, Metoe, August 30. Bayou Fourche and capture of Little Rock September 10. Pursuit of Price September 11–14. Near Little Rock September 11. Transferred to new Battery "E" September 29, 1863. Reorganized at St. Louis, Mo., February 15, 1864. Duty at St. Louis till August, 1864. Ordered to Springfield, Mo., August 15, and duty there till November. Moved to Paducah, Ky., November 10, to Rolla November 26, thence to Franklin, Mo., and duty there till June, 1865. Moved to Omaha, Neb., June 11–20. Powder River Expedition. March to Powder River and Fort Connor July 1-September 20. Actions on Powder River September 2–8. Mustered out December 20, 1865.

Commanders
 Captain Napoleon Boardman

See also

 2nd Missouri Light Artillery Regiment
 Missouri Civil War Union units
 Missouri in the Civil War

References
 Dyer, Frederick H.  A Compendium of the War of the Rebellion (Des Moines, IA:  Dyer Pub. Co.), 1908.
Attribution
 

Military units and formations established in 1862
Military units and formations disestablished in 1865
Units and formations of the Union Army from Missouri
1862 establishments in Missouri
Artillery units and formations of the American Civil War